Joshua "Josh" McKay is a retired American soccer player who is an assistant coach with the University of San Francisco men's soccer team.  He played professionally in Major League Soccer and the USISL.

Youth
McKay grew up in Pleasanton, California.  In 1991, he began his collegiate career at UNLV.  He transferred to University of San Francisco after his freshman year and played three seasons for the Dons.  He graduated in 1995 with a bachelor's degree in English.

Professional
In 1995, McKay played for the Hawaii Tsunami of the USISL.  On February 7, 1996, the Colorado Rapids selected McKay in the thirteenth round (122nd overall) of the 1996 MLS Inaugural Player Draft.  He played four games for the Rapids before being waived on November 8, 1996.  In 1997, McKay signed with the Richmond Kickers.  He played through the 2002 season with Richmond.  When the Kickers released him in the spring of 2003, McKay retired and entered the coaching ranks.

Coach
On August 13, 2003, the University of San Francisco hired McKay as an assistant coach with its men's soccer team.

References

External links
 USF Dons: Josh McKay
 MLS: Josh McKay

1971 births
Living people
American soccer coaches
American soccer players
Colorado Rapids players
Hawaii Tsunami players
Major League Soccer players
Richmond Kickers players
San Francisco Dons men's soccer coaches
San Francisco Dons men's soccer players
UNLV Rebels men's soccer players
USISL players
People from Castro Valley, California
People from Pleasanton, California
Sportspeople from Castro Valley, California
Association football midfielders
Association football defenders